Sergei Sokolov may refer to:
Sergey Sokolov (marshal) (1911–2012), Soviet Marshal
Sergei Sokolov (Azerbaijani footballer) (born 1977), Russian-Azerbaijani footballer
Sergei Sokolov (Russian footballer born 1980), played for Shinnik Yaroslavl
Sergei Sokolov (Russian footballer born 1986), plays for Smena Komsomolsk-na-Amure

See also
Sokolov (surname)